Cyperus pseudobrunneus is a species of sedge that is native to parts of eastern Africa.

See also 
 List of Cyperus species

References 

pseudobrunneus
Plants described in 1936
Flora of Madagascar
Flora of Tanzania
Flora of the Comoros
Taxa named by Georg Kükenthal